David Lloyd Jones, Lord Lloyd-Jones, PC, FLSW (born 13 January 1952) is a British judge and legal scholar. He has served as a Justice of the Supreme Court of the United Kingdom since 2017, and has also served as a member of the Court of Appeal of England and Wales and as a chairman of the Law Commission prior to joining the Supreme Court.

Early life
Lloyd Jones was born on 13 January 1952, to William Elwyn Jones and Annie Blodwen Jones (née Lloyd-Jones). He was educated at Pontypridd Boys' Grammar School. He studied law at Downing College, Cambridge: he graduated with a first class Bachelor of Arts (BA) degree, later promoted to a Master of Arts (MA Cantab) degree, and a first class Bachelor of Laws (LLB) degree (since renamed by Cambridge to the LLM).

Career

Academic career
Lloyd Jones was a Fellow of Downing College, Cambridge from 1975 to 1991. From 1999 to 2005, he was a visiting professor at City University, London. He has written articles that have been published in a number of academic journals specialising in law.

Legal career
Lloyd Jones was called to the bar in 1975 (Middle Temple). He became a recorder in 1994 and served as a junior Crown Counsel (Common Law) from 1997 to 1999. Lloyd Jones became a Queen's Counsel in 1999.

On 3 October 2005, he was appointed as a High Court judge, and was assigned to the Queen's Bench Division. He served as presiding judge on the Wales and Chester Circuit and chairman of the Lord Chancellor's Standing Committee on the Welsh Language from 2008 to 2011. On 1 October 2012, Lloyd Jones was appointed a Lord Justice of Appeal, and was appointed to the Privy Council on 7 November 2012.

On 2 October 2017 Lloyd Jones was appointed a Justice of the Supreme Court of the United Kingdom, where he chose the judicial courtesy title of Lord Lloyd-Jones. He retired on 13 January 2022 upon attaining 70 years of age, the last justice so to retire before the retirement age was raised to 75. He then became a member of the supplementary panel.

On 17 August 2022, after the mandatory retirement age changed to 75, it was announced that Lloyd-Jones had been reappointed to the Supreme Court.

He is Treasurer of Middle Temple for 2023.

Honours
In 2005, upon being appointed a High Court judge, he received the customary appointment of Knight Bachelor. On 14 February 2006, he was knighted at Buckingham Palace by Queen Elizabeth II.

He was made an Honorary Fellow of Aberystwyth University in 2012. He was awarded an honorary degree by Swansea University in 2014. In 2016, he was elected a Fellow of the Learned Society of Wales (FLSW).

See also
List of judges of the Court of Appeal of England and Wales

References

1952 births
Living people
Alumni of Downing College, Cambridge
Fellows of Downing College, Cambridge
Welsh King's Counsel
Knights Bachelor
Members of the Privy Council of the United Kingdom
21st-century English judges
People educated at Pontypridd High School
Judges of the Supreme Court of the United Kingdom
Members of the Middle Temple
Fellows of the Learned Society of Wales
20th-century Welsh writers
21st-century Welsh writers
20th-century Welsh judges